Ibrahim Ahmad Taib Hazzazi [ابراهيم احمد طيب هزازي in Arabic] (born 22 November 1986) is a former Saudi Arabian footballer. He is the brother of striker Naif Hazazi.

Club career
Hazzazi spent his entire career playing domestically. His notable clubs are Al-Ahli and Al-Ittihad.

International career
He played for Saudi Arabia at the AFC Asian Cup 2007.

Honours

Al-Ahli (Jeddah)
Saudi Crown Prince Cup: 2007
Saudi Champions Cup: 2011

National Team
2007 AFC Asian Cup: Runner-up

References

Ittihad FC players
Al-Ahli Saudi FC players
Living people
Saudi Arabian footballers
Saudi Arabia international footballers
Sportspeople from Jeddah
2007 AFC Asian Cup players
1984 births
Ettifaq FC players
Najran SC players
Al-Orobah FC players
Jeddah Club players
Saudi First Division League players
Saudi Professional League players
Association football defenders